Saint Peter Gonzalez Church is a Catholic church located at Largo de São Frei Pedro Gonçalves (which includes the church, houses and Hotel Globo). It is on top of the hill of the old Porto do Varadouro, in front of the Sanhauá River in the historic center of João Pessoa, capital of the Brazilian state of Paraíba. It stands out for its eclectic architecture with Neoclassical influences.

History

The church was built in 1843 with the contributions of merchants and fishermen, who settled on Rua Direita (Rua Duque de Caxias). The church initially bore the name of Church of the Navegantes; later, it was renamed for Saint Peter González, who is the Spanish patron saint of navigators.

Archaeological Discovery

During the restoration of the church in 2000, technicians (historians, archaeologists and architects) identified the ruins of a fortification built at the end of the 16th century. In a preliminary assessment by Brazilian National Institute of Historic and Artistic Heritage (IPHAN) technicians, they may be the walls of a fortress, possibly the Fort of Varadouro. During excavation, the water source that archaeologists believe to have supplied the population  was also found, as well as tunnels for water drainage, human bones and ceramic material. This may be related to the first settlements of the then , of 1585.

See also
Church of Mercy
Church and Convent of Our Lady of the Rosary
Monastery of St. Benedict
Cathedral Basilica of Our Lady of the Snows
São Francisco Cultural Center

References

Roman Catholic churches completed in 1843
Roman Catholic churches in Paraíba
Dominican churches